Northern Samar's at-large congressional district was a short-lived congressional district that encompassed the entire province of Northern Samar in the Philippines. It was represented in the House of Representatives from 1965 to 1972 and in the Batasang Pambansa from 1984 to 1986. The province of Northern Samar was created as a result of the partition of Samar in 1965 and elected its first representative provincewide at-large during that year's House elections. Before 1965, the territory of Northern Samar comprised most of Samar's 1st congressional district whose representative during the partition, Eladio T. Balite, also served as the new province's first representative. A special election was held two years later in 1967 concurrent with that year's Senate election following Balite's death, with the province electing Eusebio Moore to serve his remaining term in the 6th Congress.

The district was eliminated following the dissolution of the lower house in 1972 but was later absorbed by the multi-member Region VIII's at-large district for the interim parliament in 1978. In 1984, provincial and city representations were restored with Northern Samar electing a member for the regular parliament from the same provincewide electoral district. The district finally became obsolete following the 1987 reapportionment that established two districts in the province under a new constitution.

Representation history

See also
Legislative districts of Northern Samar

References

Former congressional districts of the Philippines
Politics of Northern Samar
1965 establishments in the Philippines
1986 disestablishments in the Philippines
At-large congressional districts of the Philippines
Congressional districts of Eastern Visayas
Constituencies established in 1965
Constituencies disestablished in 1986